Waldemar Łysiak (born 22 March 1944) is a bestselling Polish writer, art historian and journalist, who has written under his own name as well as the pseudonyms 'Valdemar Baldhead' (a rough translation of his name), 'Archibald', 'Mark W. Kingden', 'Rezerwowy Ł.'. He is notable as an author of numerous books on the Napoleonic era, both historical and fiction. He also owns a large number of rare prints and manuscripts, among others the poems by Norwid and the only surviving copy of Kochanowski's Treny.

He is well known for his traditional and deeply anti-communist views, and is the father of Tomasz Łysiak, who is a well-known radio journalist, actor and a fantasy writer.

Łysiak publishes for polish weekly news magazines "Uważam Rze" (since 2011) and "Do Rzeczy" (since January 2013).

Education
Łysiak attended the Bolesław Prus High School in Warsaw, and went on to study architecture at the Warsaw Technical University, graduating in 1968. He later studied History of Art at the University of Rome as well as the international Centre of Conservation Study in Rome. In 1977 he gained a Doctorate from the Warsaw Technical University. His thesis was titled 'Napoleon's Doctrine of Fortification'. He lectured on culture and civilization at the Department of Architecture, Warsaw Technical University.

Controversy
Łysiak's works are often controversial politically. He began this theme with the trilogy Dobry (Good), Konkwista (Conquest) and Najlepszy (The Best), which alluded to events surrounding the end of the PRL (People's Republic of Poland) and the beginning of III RP (Third Republic of Poland), and took this further with the Rzeczpospolita kłamców (Republic of Liars) and Alfabet Szulerow (An A-Z of Conmen). In all of these books Łysiak attacks people he claims are the founders of the Third Polish Republic (see Round Table Agreement). Łysiak calls these people the pink saloon (różowy salon), with Adam Michnik regarded as the leader of these liberal intellectuals.

In 2006 Wojciech Czuchnowski published an article in the Gazeta Wyborcza entitled 'Waldemar Łysiak, Baron Münchhausen of the 4th RP'. Czuchnowski accused Łysiak of re-styling himself as an outspoken critic of the PRL, whereas at the time he was allegedly 'looked after' by the authorities, as his books enjoyed large publishing runs, and he was frequently interviewed by newspapers. Łysiak responded with an article in the Gazeta Polska entitled 'The Salon Retaliation, or 'hand, foot, brain on the wall'.

Bibliography
 Kolebka (Poznań 1974, 1983, 1987, 1988)
 Wyspy zaczarowane (Warszawa 1974, 1978, Kraków 1986, Chicago-Warszawa 1997)
 Szuańska ballada (Warszawa 1976, 1980, Kraków 1991)
 Francuska ścieżka (Warszawa 1976, 1980, Kraków 1984, Exlibris 2000)
 Empirowy pasjans (Warszawa 1977, 1984, Poznań 1990)
 Cesarski poker (Warszawa 1978, Kraków 1991)
 Perfidia (Warszawa 1980, Kraków 1991)
 Asfaltowy saloon (Warszawa 1980, 1986)
 Szachista (Warszawa 1980, Kraków 1982, 1989)
 Flet z mandragory (Warszawa 1981, 1996, Kraków 1982)
 Frank Lloyd Wright (Warszawa 1982, Chicago-Warszawa 1999)
 MW (Kraków 1984, 1988)
 Łysiak Fiction (Warszawa 1986)
 Wyspy bezludne (Kraków 1987, Warszawa 1994)
 Łysiak na łamach (Warszawa 1988)
 Konkwista (Warszawa 1988, 1989, Chicago-Warszawa 1997)
 Dobry (Warszawa 1990, Chicago-Warszawa 1997)
 Napoleoniada (Warszawa 1990, Chicago-Warszawa 1998)
 Lepszy (Warszawa 1990)
 Milczące psy (Kraków 1990, Chicago-Warszawa 1997)
 Najlepszy (Warszawa 1992, Chicago-Warszawa 1997)
 Łysiak na łamach 2 (Warszawa 1993)
 Statek (Warszawa 1994, Chicago-Warszawa 1999)
 Łysiak na łamach 3 (Warszawa 1995)
 Wilk i kuglarz - Łysiak na łamach 4 (Warszawa 1995)
 Old-Fashion Man - Łysiak na łamach 5 (Chicago-Warszawa 1997)
 Malarstwo Białego Człowieka - tom 1 (Poznań 1997)
 Malarstwo Białego Człowieka - tom 2 (Chicago-Warszawa 1997)
 Malarstwo Białego Człowieka - tom 3 (Chicago-Warszawa 1998)
 Malarstwo Białego Człowieka - tom 4 (Chicago-Warszawa 1998)
 Poczet Królów bałwochwalców (Chicago-Warszawa 1998)
 Malarstwo Białego Człowieka - tom 5 (Chicago-Warszawa 1999)
 Napoleon fortyfikator (Chicago-Warszawa 1999)
 Malarstwo Białego Człowieka - tom 6 (Chicago-Warszawa 1999)
 Cena (Chicago-Warszawa 2000) 
 Malarstwo Białego Człowieka - tom 7 (Chicago-Warszawa 2000)
 Stulecie kłamców (Chicago-Warszawa 2000)
 Malarstwo Białego Człowieka - tom 8 (Chicago-Warszawa 2000)
 Wyspa zaginionych skarbów 2001
 Łysiak na łamach 6. Piórem i mieczem 2001
 Kielich (2002)
 Empireum (2003)
 Rzeczpospolita kłamców - Salon (2004) 
 Ostatnia kohorta (2005)
 Najgorszy (2006)
 Alfabet szulerów część pierwsza A-L. Salon 2. (2006) 
 Alfabet szulerów część druga M-Z. Salon 2. (2006) 
 Talleyrand - Droga "Mefistofelesa". Warszawa (2007) 
 Lider (2008) 
 Historia Saskiej Kępy (2008) 
 Mitologia świata bez klamek (2008)

References

External links

 Internet Fan Club "Łysiakomania" 
 VIRTUAL ISLANDS - the works of W. Łysiak 
 Błotne kąpiele - 'Muddy Baths', Szczecin University Politics Student article 

Polish male writers
Polish art historians
1944 births
Living people